The 1980 Tournament Players Championship was a golf tournament in Florida on the PGA Tour, held March 20–23 at Sawgrass Country Club in Ponte Vedra Beach, southeast of Jacksonville. The seventh Tournament Players Championship, it was the fourth at Sawgrass and Lee Trevino won at 278 (−10), one stroke ahead of runner-up Ben Crenshaw.

Defending champion Lanny Wadkins finished thirteen strokes back, in a tie for 45th place.

Venue

This was the fourth of five Tournament Players Championships held at Sawgrass Country Club; it moved to the nearby TPC at Sawgrass Stadium Course in 1982. At the time it was scheduled to be the last at Sawgrass, but early construction delays due to weather caused the championship to return for a fifth and final year in 1981.

Eligibility requirements
1. All designated players

Andy Bean (2), Ben Crenshaw (2), Lee Elder, Raymond Floyd (2), Al Geiberger (2), Bob Gilder, David Graham (2), Lou Graham (2), Hubert Green (2), Mark Hayes, Lon Hinkle (2), Hale Irwin (2), Tom Kite, Wayne Levi (2), Bruce Lietzke, John Mahaffey, Jerry McGee (2), Gil Morgan (2), Larry Nelson (2), Jack Nicklaus, Andy North, Jerry Pate, Calvin Peete (2), Gary Player, Tom Purtzer, Jack Renner (2), Bill Rogers, J. C. Snead, Ed Sneed, Dave Stockton, Curtis Strange (2), Lee Trevino (2), Howard Twitty (2), Bobby Wadkins, Lanny Wadkins (2), Tom Watson (2), Fuzzy Zoeller (2)

2. Winners of major PGA Tour co-sponsored or approved events beginning with the 1979 Players Championship and concluding with the tournament immediately preceding the 1980 Players Championship

Bobby Walzel, Chi-Chi Rodríguez, D. A. Weibring, John Fought, Ed Fiori, George Burns, Craig Stadler, Jeff Mitchell, Jim Colbert, Dave Eichelberger, Johnny Miller

3. The current British Open champion

Seve Ballesteros

4. Leaders in the PGA Tour Official Standings as necessary to complete the field, beginning with the 1979 Players Championship and concluding with the Jackie Gleason-Inverrary Classic, which concludes March 9, 1980

Source:

Field
Tommy Aaron, Buddy Allin, George Archer, Wally Armstrong, Seve Ballesteros, Miller Barber, Andy Bean, Don Bies, Mike Brannan, Brad Bryant, George Burns, Bob Byman, George Cadle, Rex Caldwell, Bill Calfee, Jim Chancey, Jim Colbert, Frank Conner, Charles Coody, Ben Crenshaw, Rod Curl, Jim Dent, Bruce Devlin, Terry Diehl, Ed Dougherty, Bob Eastwood, Danny Edwards, David Edwards, David Eger, Dave Eichelberger, Lee Elder, Keith Fergus, Forrest Fezler, Ed Fiori, Bruce Fleisher, Raymond Floyd, John Fought, Rod Funseth, Buddy Gardner, Gibby Gilbert, Bob Gilder, David Graham, Lou Graham, Hubert Green, Jay Haas, Dan Halldorson, Phil Hancock, Morris Hatalsky, Mark Hayes, Dave Hill, Mike Hill, Lon Hinkle, Joe Inman, Hale Irwin, Peter Jacobsen, Barry Jaeckel, Don January, Grier Jones, Tom Kite, Gary Koch, Billy Kratzert, Stan Lee, Wayne Levi, Bruce Lietzke, John Lister, Gene Littler, Mark Lye, John Mahaffey, Bob Mann, Graham Marsh, Fred Marti, Rik Massengale, Terry Mauney, Gary McCord, Mike McCullough, Mark McCumber, Jerry McGee, Pat McGowan, Artie McNickle, Steve Melnyk, Allen Miller, Johnny Miller, Lindy Miller, Jeff Mitchell, Orville Moody, Gil Morgan, Mike Morley, Bob Murphy, Jim Nelford, Larry Nelson, Jack Newton, Jack Nicklaus, Lonnie Nielsen, Andy North, Peter Oosterhuis, Jerry Pate, Eddie Pearce, Calvin Peete, Mark Pfeil, Gary Player, Dan Pohl, Don Pooley, Greg Powers, Tom Purtzer, Dana Quigley, Sammy Rachels, Victor Regalado, Mike Reid, Jack Renner, Chi-Chi Rodríguez, Bill Rogers, Bill Sander, Cesar Sanudo, John Schroeder, Bob Shearer, Jim Simons, Scott Simpson, Tim Simpson, Bob E. Smith, J. C. Snead, Ed Sneed, Craig Stadler, Ken Still, Dave Stockton, Curtis Strange, Ron Streck, Mike Sullivan, Alan Tapie, Doug Tewell, Barney Thompson, Leonard Thompson, Jim Thorpe, Lee Trevino, Howard Twitty, Bobby Wadkins, Lanny Wadkins, Bobby Walzel, Tom Watson, D. A. Weibring, Tom Weiskopf, Kermit Zarley, Bob Zender, Larry Ziegler, Fuzzy Zoeller

Round summaries

First round 
Thursday, March 20, 1980

Source:

Second round 
Friday, March 21, 1980

Source:

Third round 
Saturday, March 22, 1980

Source:

Final round
Sunday, March 23, 1980

References

External links
The Players Championship website

1980
1980 in golf
1980 in American sports
1980 in sports in Florida
March 1980 sports events in the United States